The Cercle des nageurs de Marseille (Circle of Marseille's swimmers) is an elite swim club based in Marseille, France, founded in 1921. It is best known for its water polo team which is the most decorated in France, and also for training many of the French Olympic swimmers, including Frédérick Bousquet, Fabien Gilot, Camille Lacourt, Florent Manaudou, Laure Manaudou and others.

Facilities
Located at the east of the city, next to the sea, the club has 3 pool, 2 covered (one long course, one short course) and one outside short course.

Waterpolo

Honours

Domestic competitions 
National Championship (38): 1965, 1966, 1967, 1968, 1969, 1970, 1973, 1974, 1975, 1976, 1977, 1978, 1979, 1980, 1981, 1982, 1983, 1984, 1985, 1986, 1987, 1988, 1989, 1990, 1991, 1996, 2005, 2006, 2007, 2008, 2009, 2010, 2011, 2013, 2015, 2016, 2017, 2021
National Cup (11): 1991, 1996, 1997, 1998, 1999, 2007, 2009, 2010, 2011, 2012.
League Cup (2): 2015, 2018.

European competitions 
LEN Euro Cup
Winners (1): 2019

Notable players
 Michaël Bodegas
 Ugo Crousillat
 Ante Vukičević
 Uroš Čučković
 Mlađan Janović
 Dejan Lazović
 Miloš Šćepanović
 Vladan Spaić
 Andrija Prlainović

External links
 Official Website in french

Swimming clubs
Water polo clubs in France
Sport in Marseille